Kunmin is a village in Hopang District, Wa Self-Administered Division of Myanmar.

Geography
Kunmin is located in the valley of the Nam Ting River, a tributary of the Salween, about 4 km west of Hopang.

See also
Wa States

Further reading
 Harold Mason Young, Burma Headhunters, Xlibris, 2014,

References

External links
Kunmin Monthly Climate Average, Myanmar

Populated places in Shan State
Wa people